This is a list of testimonial matches involving Leeds Rhinos players.

Testimonials

Leeds Rhinos